Josh Kline (born 1979 in Philadelphia, Pennsylvania, United States) is an American artist and curator living and working in New York City.

Kline had his first solo gallery exhibition at 47Canal in 2011. In 2014 his work "Skittles" was displayed along the High Line in the borough of Manhattan in New York City. In 2015 His installation "Freedom" (wherein Teletubby statues stand in the abound in SWAT gear while a computerized version of Barack Obama's 2008 Presidential inaugural address is played was included in the New Museum Triennial, Surround Audience".  The aforementioned piece gained widespread attention and acclaim in the News and art presses. In 2015, his piece "Cost of Living (Aleyda), 2014" was included in "America is Hard to See", the opening exhibition of the new Whitney Museum of American Art facility in the Meatpacking area of Manhattan, which was composed entirely of works from their permanent collection.

He participated in the 2019 Whitney Biennial.

References

External links
  Official website

1979 births
Living people
People from Philadelphia